Warrimoo Public School is a primary school located in Warrimoo, New South Wales, Australia. It was established in 1962 with about 70 students.

Warrmioo Public School teaches children from Kindergarten to Year 6 according to the state provided curriculum in areas such as:
 Creative arts
 English
 Human society and its environment (HSIE)
 Mathematics
 Personal development, health and physical education (PDHPE)
 Science and technology

Resilient Australia Award 
Warrimoo Public School was awarded the Resilient Australia Award on 16 October 2018. This was in recognisition of the school's preparation for the seasons bushfires.

The award was presented by Emergency Services Minister Troy Grant at New South Wales Parliament House.

References

External links

Public primary schools in New South Wales
Educational institutions established in 1962
1962 establishments in Australia
Education in the Blue Mountains (New South Wales)